South Koel River is a  long river which runs across Jharkhand and Odisha states in India. It originates on the Lawapani Waterfalls, near Lohardaga, Chota Nagpur Plateau a Lawapani Waterfalls, near Lohardaga, Chota Nagpur Plateau  from Ranchi, and conjoins the Belsiangar and Singbhum Rivers. The Koel is fed by three streams in Jharkhand, namely the North Karo, South Karo and Koina. The South Koel enters Odisha and joins with  Sankh River at Vedavyas near Rourkela from where it is named as Brahmani.

West Singhbhum drainage scenario
Singhbhum is drained by three river systems - Subarnarekha, Baitarani and Brahmani. The watersheds of these three systems originate near Gamharia in the Kolhan and radiate north-west, south-west and east respectively from their common, centre. These watersheds divide the Subarnarekha and its feeders from the Baitarani and its tributaries, and the latter again from the South Karo and Deo rivers, which feed the Brahmani through the South Koel. 

Of these three great rivers the Subarnarekha alone flows through the district. The Baitarani forms for about  the boundary between the Kolhan area and Keonjhar (in Odisha) while the Brahmani drains the west of the district through its tributary, the South Koel, and its feeders, the North Karo and the South Karo, and the latter of which in its turn is fed by the Deo river.

Koel-Karo project
The Koel-Karo project is located in the Ranchi and West Singbhum districts. The two dams will be linked by a trans-basin channel, with six units of 115 MW each in the underground powerhouse at Lumpu-ngkhel and one unit of 20 MW at Raitoli. About 120 villages are to be affected, displacing over one lakh (100,000) people. About  of land will be submerged. Of the total land acquisition,  are reported to be agricultural land, while  comprise forests. Dispute arose over the compensation package for the displaced people and protests started in 1974 and have been continuing since then. The project was finally shelved in 2003 bowing to protests.

References 

Rivers of Jharkhand
Sundergarh district
Rivers of Odisha
Rivers of India